Dayabasti railway station is a small railway station in Dayabasti which is a residential and commercial neighborhood of the North Delhi district of Delhi. Its code is DBSI. The station is part of  Delhi Suburban Railway. The station consist of four platforms.

See also

 Hazrat Nizamuddin railway station
 New Delhi railway station
 Delhi Junction railway station
 Anand Vihar Terminal railway station
 Sarai Rohilla railway station
 Delhi Metro

References

External links

Railway stations in North Delhi district
Delhi railway division